Island council elections were held in the Netherlands Antilles in 1975. They were the seventh elections for the Island Council.

Aruba

Results

Saba

General elections were held in Saba in 1975. The result was a victory for the Windward Islands People's Movement, which won four of the five seats in the Island Council.

Results

Sint Maarten

General elections were held in Sint Maarten on 9 May 1975 to elect the 5 members of the Island Council. The result was a victory for the Democratic Party, which won all five Island Council seats.

Results

References

Aruba
Election and referendum articles with incomplete results